Jorge Prado Rus (born 20 January 1982 in Madrid) is a Spanish footballer who plays for CF Pozuelo de Alarcón as a defender.

References

External links

1982 births
Living people
Footballers from Madrid
Spanish footballers
Association football defenders
Segunda División B players
Tercera División players
Atlético Madrid C players
CF Rayo Majadahonda players
APEP FC players
Atromitos Yeroskipou players
Cypriot First Division players
Cypriot Second Division players
Spanish expatriate footballers
Expatriate footballers in Cyprus
Spanish expatriate sportspeople in Cyprus